Charles M. Easterday (December 17, 1855 – December 4, 1918) was an American politician in the state of Washington. He served in the Washington State Senate from 1891 to 1899.

References

1855 births
1918 deaths
Republican Party Washington (state) state senators
19th-century American politicians